Ramji Gautam is an Indian politician and a political Strategist. He was born in Jatav family. He is currently a Member of Parliament in Rajya Sabha, the Upper House of the Indian Parliament. He has been the National Vice-president and current national coordinator of the Bahujan Samaj Party.

References

Living people
Rajya Sabha members from Uttar Pradesh
Bahujan Samaj Party politicians
Bahujan Samaj Party politicians from Uttar Pradesh
1976 births